Archbishop Emeritus Joachim N'Dayen (born 22 December 1934, in Loko) is a former Roman Catholic archbishop in the Central African Republic.  He was the archbishop of the Roman Catholic Archdiocese of Bangui, the capital city of the Central African Republic.  He became archbishop in September 1970, when he became the first Roman Catholic archbishop in the country.  He resigned in 2003 and was replaced by Paulin Pomodimo.

References 

1934 births
Living people
People from Bangui
Central African Republic Roman Catholic archbishops
People from Lobaye
Roman Catholic archbishops of Bangui